Jonathan Souza Motta (born March 7, 1989 in Montevideo) is a Uruguayan footballer currently playing as a defender for Club Atlético Progreso of the Uruguayan Primera División.

Teams
  Liverpool 2010-2011
  Boca Unidos 2011
  Rampla Juniors 2012
  Progreso 2013

References
 Profile at BDFA 
 

1989 births
Living people
Uruguayan footballers
Uruguayan expatriate footballers
Liverpool F.C. (Montevideo) players
Boca Unidos footballers
Rampla Juniors players
Expatriate footballers in Argentina

Association football defenders